The Prost JS45 was the Formula One racing car with which the Prost team competed in the 1997 Formula One World Championship, and the first Prost-badged car following Alain Prost's acquisition of Ligier in February 1997.

Development
The acquisition of Ligier from Flavio Briatore by Prost, and its subsequent renaming after him, marked the end of the Ligier name in F1 after involvement in the sport since . However, the car had been designed and built beforehand, and so retained its Ligier designation of JS45. Also retained were Mugen Honda engines and Gauloises sponsorship, though the team opted for Bridgestone tyres in the Japanese's company's first year of F1.

Race history
Prost's lead driver was Olivier Panis, who had driven for Ligier since 1994, while the second seat was taken by Japanese rookie Shinji Nakano, largely due to pressure from engine suppliers Mugen.

In the first six races of the season, the JS45 proved extremely promising. The problems of braking and pitch sensitivity with the previous year's Ligier JS43 had been largely solved, and this, allied with Panis' skill and the durability of the Bridgestones, enabled the French driver to finish fifth in Australia, third in Brazil, fourth in Monaco and then second in Spain, just six seconds behind eventual World Champion Jacques Villeneuve. These results put him third in the Drivers' Championship, and after the Spanish Grand Prix Villeneuve said that he regarded Panis as one of his main threats for the rest of the season.

However, a suspected suspension failure or puncture caused Panis to crash heavily into a concrete wall at the very next race in Canada, breaking both his legs and putting him out of action for the next seven Grands Prix. Nonetheless, the car remained competitive due to Panis' replacement Jarno Trulli, who had been recruited from Minardi. Panis returned for the final three races of the season and picked up one final point for sixth in his first race back, at the Nürburgring.

The inexperienced Nakano, meanwhile, proved solid if not spectacular, scoring two points for sixth places at Canada (after the race was stopped following Panis' crash) and Hungary. However, he did not retain his seat for 1998, as Panis stayed on alongside Trulli and the team took on Peugeot engines, swapping with Jordan.

At the end of the season, Panis was tenth in the Drivers' Championship with 16 points, while Trulli was 16th with his three points from Germany and Nakano was 19th with his two (though all three were later promoted a place following Michael Schumacher's exclusion from the standings). With a total of 21 points, Prost placed sixth in the Constructors' Championship.

Prost used 'Gauloises' logos, except at the French, British and German Grands Prix.

Complete Formula One results
(key) (results in bold indicate pole position)

References
AUTOCOURSE 1997-98, Henry, Alan (ed.), Hazleton Publishing Ltd. (1997) 

Prost Formula One cars
1997 Formula One season cars